General elections to the Cortes Generales were held in Spain in February 1836. At stake were all 149 seats in the Congress of Deputies.

Constituencies
A majority voting system was used for the election, with 48 multi-member constituencies and 1 single-member constituency.

Results

References

 Estadísticas históricas de España: siglos XIX-XX.

1836 elections in Spain
1836a
February 1836 events